Poppenhausen is a municipality in the district of Fulda, in Hesse, Germany. it is the home of Alexander Schleicher GmbH & Co, the oldest manufacturer of gliders.

References

Municipalities in Hesse
Fulda (district)